This is a list of notable jockeys, both male and female, covering jockeys who have competed worldwide in all forms of horse racing.



A 

 Eddie Ahern
 Robby Albarado 
 Anna Lee Aldred
 Tony Allan
 Goncalino Almeida
 Junior Alvarado
 Kim Andersen
 Jack Anthony
 Chris Antley
 Eddie Arcaro
 Fred Archer
 John Arnull
 Sam Arnull
 Cash Asmussen
 Andrea Atzeni

B 

 Mary Bacon
 Jerry Bailey
 Lester Balaski
 Ron Barry
 Donna Barton Brothers
 Michael Baze
 Russell Baze
 Tyler Baze
 Bobby Beasley
 William Beasley
 Martin Becher
 Kaye Bell
 Terry Biddlecombe
 Dominique Boeuf 
 Calvin Borel
 Glen Boss
 Opie Bosson
 Joe Bravo
 Scobie Breasley
 Paddy Brennan
 Charlotte Brew
 Shaun Bridgmohan
 Bill Broughton
 Corey Brown
 William Buick

C 
 David Campbell
 Nina Carberry
 Paul Carberry
 Tommy Carberry
 Eliza Carpenter
 Willie Carson
 G. R. Carter
 Jim Cassidy
 Larry Cassidy
 Jesús Castañón
 Javier Castellano
 Eddie Castro
 Steve Cauthen
 Bob Champion
 Jorge Chavez
 Joe Childs
 Eibar Coa
 Ray Cochrane
 Davy Condon
 Patricia Cooksey
 Bryan Cooper
 Ángel Cordero Jr.
 Jean Cruguet
 Diane Crump
 Anthony S. Cruz
 Jim Culloty
 Charlie Cunningham 
 Luke Currie

D 

 Robbie Davis
 Wantha Davis
 Pat Day
 Eddie Delahoussaye
 Cristian Demuro
 Kent Desormeaux
 Frankie Dettori
 Mick Dittman
 Guy Disney
 Ramon Domínguez
 Steve Donoghue
 Brett Doyle
 Hollie Doyle
 James Doyle
 Jimmy Duggan
 Richard Dunwoody
 Mark Du Plessis
 Martin Dwyer
 Shane Dye

E 
 Penny Ann Early
 Masayoshi Ebina
 Pat Eddery
 Stewart Elliott
 Victor Espinoza

F 

 Kieren Fallon
 Mick Fitzgerald
 Brian Fletcher
 David Romero Flores
 Jose Flores
 Jimmy Fortune
 Freddie Fox
 Richard Fox
 Dick Francis
 Manuel Franco
 John Francome
 Yuichi Fukunaga

G 
 Tyler Gaffalione
 Cathy Gannon
 Alan Garcia
 Martin Garcia
 Barry Geraghty
 Florent Geroux
 Josh Gifford
 Campbell Gillies
 Avelino Gomez
 Garrett K. Gomez
 Dick Goodisson
 Tom Goodisson
 Josephine Gordon
 Jemmy Grimshaw
 Aaron Gryder
 Mario Gutierrez

H 
 Noel Harris
 David Harrison
 Bill Hartack
 Sandy Hawley
 Chris Hayes
 Seamie Heffernan
 Brian Hernandez Jr.
 Roy Higgins
 Michael Hills
 Richard Hills
 Darryll Holland
 Norm Holland
 Rosemary Homeister Jr.
 Richard Hughes
 Patrick Husbands
 Simon Husbands
 Michael Hussey
 Adam Hyeronimus

I 
 Yasunari Iwata

J 
 John Jackson
 Daryl Jacob
 Billy Jacobson
 Chris Johnson
 Richard Johnson
 Malcolm Johnston
 Linda Jones

K 

 Willy Kan
 Stathi Katsidis
 Colin Keane
 Lizzie Kelly
 Pandu Khade
 Michael Kinane
 Julie Krone

L 
 Geoff Laidlaw
 Lucien Laurin
 Graham Lee
 Christophe Lemaire
 Julien Leparoux
 Geoff Lewis
 Jose Lezcano
 Carl Llewellyn
 Tommy Loates
 Johnny Loftus
 Johnny Longden
 Paco Lopez
 Tommy Lowrey
 Len Lungo
 Mike Luzzi

M 

 Harold Russell Maddock
 Jason Maguire
 Manfred K. L. Man
 John Mangle
 Ryan Mania
 Eddie Maple
 Rajiv Maragh
 Chris McCarron
 Tony McCoy
 Kerrin McEvoy
 James McDonald
 Miguel Mena
 Joe Mercer
 Richard Migliore
 Kirsty Milczarek
 Kousei Miura
 Martin Molony
 George Moore
 Jamie Moore
 Ryan Moore
 David Mullins
 Isaac Murphy
 Bauyrzhan Murzabayev
 Johnny Murtagh

N 
 Corey Nakatani
 Rosie Napravnik
 Suraj Narredu 
 Peter Niven

O 
 Joseph O'Brien
 Yukio Okabe
 Damien Oliver
 Henry Oliver
 Jonjo O'Neill
 Irad Ortiz Jr.
 José Ortiz
 Lance O'Sullivan

P 

 Freddie Palmer
 Stéphane Pasquier
 Billy Pearson
 Martin Pedroza
 Dave Penna
 T. J. Pereira
 Olivier Peslier
 Lester Piggott
 Yasin Pilavcılar
 Laffit Pincay Jr.
 Red Pollard
 Robbie Power
 Edgar Prado
 David Probert

Q 
 Tom Queally
 Jimmy Quinn
 Richard Quinn

R 
 Nash Rawiller
 Jorge Ricardo
 Sir Gordon Richards
 Michael Roberts
 Philip Robinson
 Willie Robinson
 Randy Romero
 Joel Rosario
 Jeremy Rose
 Katri Rosendahl
 Chris Russell
 Davy Russell

S 

 Gabriel Saez
 Yves Saint-Martin
 Jean-Luc Samyn
 Emanuel Jose Sanchez
 Ricardo Santana Jr.
 José Santos
 Peter Schiergen
 Michael Scudamore
 Peter Scudamore
 Art Sherman
 Yoshitomi Shibata
 Blake Shinn
 Bill Shoemaker
 Pesi Shroff 
 Eurico Rosa da Silva
 Bill Skelton
 Bob Skelton
 Doug Smith
 Eph Smith
 Mike Smith
 Virginia Pinky Smith
 Pat Smullen
 Alex Solis
 Christophe Soumillon
 Cédric Ségeon
 Jamie Spencer
 Y. S. Srinath
 Tommy Stack
 Andrasch Starke
 Greville Starkey
 Silvestre de Sousa
 Georges Stern
 Gary Stevens
 George Stevens
 Kayla Stra
 Andreas Suborics
 Chantal Sutherland
 Charlie Swan
 Wally Swinburn
 Walter Swinburn

T 

 Pat Taaffe
 Joe Talamo
 Koshiro Take
 Yutaka Take
 Brian Taylor
 Fred Templeman
 Sim Templeman
 Brent Thomson
 Terry J. Thompson
 Alicia Thornton
 Andrew Thornton
 Liam Treadwell
 Daniel Tudhope
 Ron Turcotte
 Hayley Turner

U 
 Bobby Ussery

V 
 Pat Valenzuela
 Alice Van-Springsteen
 Josef Váňa
 Jacinto Vásquez
 Cornelio Velásquez
 John Velazquez
 Francine Villeneuve

W 
 Michael Walker
 David Walsh
 Ruby Walsh
 Fulke Walwyn
 Tommy Weston
 Jack Westrope
 Elijah Wheatley
 Evan Williams
 Emma-Jayne Wilson
 Rick Wilson
 Fred Winter
 Otto Wonderly
 Hedley Woodhouse
 George Woolf
 Harry Wragg
 Wayne D. Wright

Y 
 Manuel Ycaza
 Raymond York

References



Lists of sportspeople by sport
Horse racing-related lists
Sports occupations and roles